For the Boys is a 1991 American musical comedy-drama film that traces the life of Dixie Leonard, a 1940s actress/singer who teams up with Eddie Sparks, a famous performer, to entertain American troops.

The film was adapted by Marshall Brickman, Neal Jimenez, and Lindy Laub from a story by Jimenez and Laub. It was directed by Mark Rydell and the original music score was composed by Dave Grusin. It stars Bette Midler, James Caan, George Segal, Patrick O'Neal, Arye Gross, and Norman Fell. A then-unknown Vince Vaughn made his film debut as a cheering soldier in a crowd.

As in The Rose, Midler's first starring role and also a large budget quasi-biopic, the film is fiction. However, actress and singer Martha Raye believed that Midler's character was based on many widely known facts about her life and career with the USO and pursued legal action based on that assumption. After a protracted legal engagement, Raye ultimately lost the case. The Caan character was generally believed to be based on Bob Hope.

For her performance, Midler won a Golden Globe Award and was nominated for the Academy Award for Best Actress. The soundtrack features covers of many classic songs, including "Come Rain or Come Shine", "Baby, It's Cold Outside" by Frank Loesser, "P.S. I Love You", "I Remember You" and the Beatles' "In My Life". Five of the 13 songs have lyrics by Johnny Mercer. The soundtrack's first single, "Every Road Leads Back to You," was an original written by Diane Warren.

Despite a mixed critical reception and box office failure, the film was adapted for the musical stage in 2011 by Aaron Thielen and Terry James and debuted at the Marriott Theatre in Lincolnshire, Illinois.

Plot
In the early 1990s, retired entertainer Dixie Leonard has a commitment to attend a Hollywood ceremony being televised live to honor her and her longtime show-biz partner Eddie Sparks. When a young man from the TV show comes to pick her up, Dixie balks and explains what brought Eddie and her together, as well as what drove them apart. The majority of the film is an extended flashback.

Dixie's story begins during World War II when she receives an offer to entertain the troops overseas as part of Eddie's act. Dixie is an instant hit with the boys in uniform, but Eddie wants her gone, ostensibly because he finds her kind of humor too coarse, but in actuality because she stole the show by topping his jokes. Dixie doesn't care for him much, either, but fellow entertainers and her joke-writer uncle Art persuade her to stay.

Eddie wins her over, particularly by reuniting Dixie with her soldier husband on stage. However, later in the war, Dixie's husband dies in battle.

Despite her distaste for Eddie, Dixie continues working with him back in the States...mostly to support herself and her son Danny. Eddie is married with daughters, yet he becomes a proud surrogate father to Danny.

As the Korean War breaks out, Eddie announces on stage that he and Dixie will be performing for the U.S. troops there, without having told Dixie of his plans first. In revenge, Dixie announces that Eddie made a $100,000 donation ($ today) to the Red Cross. Reluctantly, she travels to Korea with him. On their way to the camp, they encounter a unit of soldiers that has been ambushed. Dixie cares for a wounded soldier but cannot save him: he is pronounced dead on arrival at the field hospital. Dixie and Eddie appear to spend the night together. At the Christmas dinner, a fight ensues after Art announces to everybody that Eddie has fired him for being a communist sympathizer.

In the meantime, Danny has grown up to be a soldier like his father and is deployed to Vietnam. At Art's suggestion, Dixie eventually agrees to perform there for Christmas with Eddie. On their way to the camp, the performers are warned of the camp possibly being attacked, because of which they are to be flown out immediately after their performance. Before going on stage, Dixie and Eddie meet Danny, who reveals to them the barbarity that is spreading among his comrades. The show begins with the performance of a dancer, who starts getting harassed by the soldiers, and only Eddie's intervention prevents the situation from getting out of control. Dixie comes on stage and makes some cynical remarks about the soldiers, then sings “In My Life”. While she is still on stage, the camp is attacked in a mortar barrage. Dixie and Eddie find shelter, but Danny is killed right in front of them; both mourn deeply for him.

Dixie has not forgiven Eddie for his part in all this, and they have another heated argument in the dressing room. Eddie goes out on stage alone. But, at the last minute, because he speaks of their joint loss in Vietnam, Dixie joins him on stage for one last song and dance, before appearing to accept their mutual love for one another.

Cast

Bette Midler as Dixie Leonard
James Caan as Eddie Sparks
George Segal as Art Silver
Patrick O'Neal as Shephard
Christopher Rydell as Danny Leonard
Brandon Call as teenage Danny Leonard
Jameson Rodgers as young Danny Leonard
Arye Gross as Jeff Brooks, the young man who comes to escort Dixie
Norman Fell as Sam Schiff
Rosemary Murphy as Luanna Trott, a journalist
Bud Yorkin as Phil
Dori Brenner as Loretta, Dixie's friend on the road
Jack Sheldon as Wally Fields
Karen Martin as Victoria Lee, the dancer
Shannon Wilcox as Margaret Sparks, Eddie's wife
Michael Greene as Maj. Gen. Scott
Melissa Manchester as Corrine
Steven Kampmann as Stan Newman

Reception
The film received mixed reviews from critics, holding a 44% rating on Rotten Tomatoes based on 16 reviews, with an average rating of 5/10. John Simon of the National Review called For the Boys "mindless".

Produced on a $40 million budget, For the Boys was a commercial disappointment upon its original release, returning just $23 million in box office receipts worldwide.

Awards and nominations

Soundtrack
The soundtrack album is composed largely of popular standards from the era, although several were written after the time period in which the film takes place.

Track Listing Information based on the album's Liner Notes

"Billy-a-Dick" Performed by Bette Midlerwith Orchestra arranged & conducted by Marc ShaimanMusic composed by Hoagy CarmichaelLyrics written by Paul Francis WebsterBackground Vocals: Patty Darcy 
"Stuff Like That There" Performed by Bette Midler with Orchestra conducted by Billy MayWritten by Jay Livingston & Ray EvansArranged by Billy May & Arif Mardin
"P.S. I Love You" Performed by Bette MidlerMusic composed by Gordon JenkinsLyrics written by Johnny MercerRhythm arranged by Dave GrusinStrings arranged by Arif Mardin
"The Girl Friend of the Whirling Dervish" Orchestra arranged & conducted by Marc ShaimanMusic composed by Harry WarrenLyrics written by Al Dubin and Johnny MercerBackground Vocals arranged by Marc Shaiman, Morgan Ames & Lorraine Feather
"I Remember You/Dixie's Dream" Performed by Bette Midler and James CaanArranged by Marc Shaiman"I Remember You" Music composed by Victor Schertzinger"I Remember You" Lyrics written by Johnny Mercer"Dixie's Dream" Written by Marc Shaiman
"Baby, It's Cold Outside" Performed by Bette Midler and James CaanWritten by Frank LoesserRhythm arranged by Marc ShaimanStrings arranged by Arif Mardin
"Dreamland" Performed by Bette MidlerMusic composed and arranged by Dave GrusinLyrics written by Alan and Marilyn Bergman
"Vickie and Mr. Valves" Trumpet Solo performed by Jack SheldonOrchestra arranged & conducted by Marty PaichWritten by Lenny Lacroix
"For All We Know" Performed by Bette Midler with Orchestra conducted by Ralph BurnsMusic composed by J. Fred CootsLyrics written by Sam Lewis
"Come Rain or Come Shine" Performed by Bette MidlerMusic composed by Harold ArlenLyrics written by Johnny MercerRhythm arranged by Marc ShaimanStrings and Woodwinds arranged by Arif Mardin
"In My Life" Performed by Bette MidlerWritten by John Lennon and Paul McCartneyMusic arranged by Robbie BuchananStrings and Background Vocals arranged by Arif MardinGuitar: Steve LukatherMusic programmed by Robbie Buchanan, Joe Mardin & Eric Persing
"I Remember You" Performed by Bette Midler with Orchestra conducted by Arif MardinMusic composed by Victor SchertzingerLyrics written by Johnny MercerBackground Vocals arranged by Arif Mardin
"Every Road Leads Back to You" Performed by Bette MidlerWritten by Diane WarrenArranged by Joe MardinDrums: Jeff PorcaroGuitar: John Goux

Two Bette Midler singles were issued from the soundtrack, although neither performed particularly well on the U.S. singles charts. "Every Road Leads Back to You" peaked at No. 78 on the Billboard Hot 100 and No. 15 on the Adult Contemporary chart, while "In My Life" reached No. 20 on the Adult Contemporary chart while failing to register at all on the pop side.

References

External links

1991 films
1990s English-language films
20th Century Fox films
1990s musical comedy-drama films
1990s romantic comedy-drama films
American musical comedy-drama films
American romantic comedy-drama films
Films scored by Dave Grusin
Films about music and musicians
Films directed by Mark Rydell
Films featuring a Best Musical or Comedy Actress Golden Globe winning performance
Films set in the 1940s
Films set in the 1950s
Films set in the 1960s
Films with screenplays by Marshall Brickman
1991 comedy films
1991 drama films
1990s American films